Ben Folds Live is a live album by Ben Folds, released on October 8, 2002. This album marked the first official release of the Ben Folds' improvisation, "Rock This Bitch". The song, which changes with every performance, is now a staple of his live performances, with recorded versions also appears on his later albums Songs for Goldfish (under the name "Weather Channel Music") and on the Live in Perth DVD (in which he "rocks this bitch orchestrally" with the West Australian Symphony Orchestra).

This album was made available for a limited time with a bonus DVD. It had 8 tracks, including a video of the audience shooting the front cover (during which they all gave him the finger and yelled "Ben Folds sucks!"). This was also notable for the first appearance of the altered, minor-key version of the Ben Folds Five favorite "Song for the Dumped" on an official release. This version also includes Darren Jessee's "missing lyrics" ("You fucking whore" repeated a few times).

The Japanese release of the album included a live version of "Eddie Walker" and the studio recording of "Bizarre Christmas Incident". The 'L' in "Live" on the front cover is actually an upside-down 'F', as though it used to say "Ben Folds Five", the name of Ben's group before he began his solo career.

The cover of the album was taken June 8, 2002 at Avalon in Boston, MA during the "Ben Folds and a Piano" tour. The original image is of everyone in the crowd giving Ben the middle finger, however the fingers are edited out of the photo in the cover shown here. The "explicit" version of the cover shows the fingers.

Track listing

Limited Edition Bonus DVD
"Not the Same" (Same version as Track #5 on the CD)
"Philosophy (Inc Misirlou)"
"Army"
"Album Art Antics" (photographing the cover; see above)
"Eddie Walker"
"The Ascent of Stan"
"Tiny Dancer"
"Song for the Dumped" (in a minor key)

Personnel
Ben Folds – vocals, piano
John McCrea – vocals on track 8 (of CD)

Production
Producers: Marc Chevalier, Ben Folds
Engineer: Marc Chevalier
Mixing: Marc Chevalier
Mastering: Ted Jensen
A&R: Ben Goldman, James Hynes, Fleming McWilliams
Project manager: Scott Carter
Compilation: Marc Chevalier
Crew: Marc Chevalier
Photography: David Leyes, Steve Volpe, Ben Folds
Package design: John Heiden

Charts

References

2002 live albums
Ben Folds video albums
2002 video albums
Live video albums
Albums produced by Ben Folds